Athadu Aame O Scooter is a 2013 Indian Telugu-language romantic comedy film directed by Gangarapu Laxman and written by Jagadeesh Bagli. The film stars Vennela Kishore as the main lead for the first time in his career opposite Priyanka Chhabra as the female lead. The films also stars other comedians like Thagubothu Ramesh, Prithviraj and Dhanraj. The film is produced by Amarendra Retard under Pyramid Creations, with Chinni Krishna scoring the music. The film, one of the most awaited Telugu film mainly because this was the first ever film where Vennela Kishore played the main male lead, was released on 23 August 2013,.

Cast 
Vennela Kishore as Govind Raju B.A Pass
Priyanka Chhabra as Lucky/ Lakshmi
Thagubothu Ramesh as Govind Raju's best friend
 Sandhya Janak

Reception 
A critic from The Times of India wrote that "Watching crows sing will be funnier than this movie, unless off course you find things like a scooter running on cow urine funny".

References 

2010s Telugu-language films
Indian romantic comedy films